New Zealand won 24 medals at the 1984 Summer Paralympics: 8 golds, 10 silver and 6 bronze medals.

Medalists

See also
 New Zealand at the Paralympics
 New Zealand at the 1984 Summer Olympics

References

External links
International Paralympic Committee
 Paralympics New Zealand

Nations at the 1984 Summer Paralympics
1984
Paralympics